Boughton Aluph and Eastwell are two civil parishes in the Borough of Ashford in Kent, England sharing a joint parish council. They include three settlements: the villages of Boughton Aluph, Boughton Lees and Eastwell. The latter is dominated by Eastwell Park, a large area of parkland and country estate.

References

Local government in Kent
Borough of Ashford